Langhirano is a comune (municipality) in the Province of Parma in the Italian region Emilia-Romagna, located about  west of Bologna and about  south of Parma.

Langhirano borders the following municipalities: Calestano, Corniglio, Felino, Lesignano de' Bagni, Neviano degli Arduini, Parma, Tizzano Val Parma.

Its most striking feature is the castle of Torrechiara. The town is also known as a major production centre for the Prosciutto di Parma.

Langhirano was the childhood home of soprano Renata Tebaldi, who is buried there.

International relations

 
Langhirano is twinned with:
 Cavaillon, France
 Espalion, France
 Tauste, Spain
 Nove, Italy

References

External links
 www.comune.langhirano.pr.it

Cities and towns in Emilia-Romagna